Rajiv Gandhi Stadium is an athletic stadium in Mualpui, Salem Veng, Aizawl, Mizoram, India. It is used mainly for football and athletic games. This stadium is named after Rajiv Gandhi, 6th Prime Minister of India and currently it is the home stadium of I-League side Aizawl FC. The stadium is also used by clubs of the Mizoram Premier League.

Stadium
The stadium is a two tier stadium. The stadium under construction will have a seating capacity of 20,000 spectators. The Stadium is used as home by Aizawl FC for I League games.

History
The Foundation stone for Rajiv Gandhi Stadium, Salem Veng, Mualpui, Aizawl was laid by Sonia Gandhi  on 6 March 2010 in presence of Chief Minister of Mizoram, Pu Lalthanhawla. This complex was the venue for the 26th 2012 Northeast Games.

References 
 

Football venues in Mizoram
Aizawl
Sports venues in Mizoram
Football in Mizoram
Aizawl FC
Luangmual F.C.
2010 establishments in Mizoram
Sports venues completed in 2010